Saint Oswald may refer to:

Oswald of Northumbria (c.604–642), King of Northumbria, venerated in Anglican Communion and Roman Catholic Church
Oswald of Worcester (died 992), Archbishop of York, venerated in Anglican Communion and Roman Catholic Church